Voices of Fire is a 2020 gospel musical documentary television series that follows Pharrell Williams, his uncle Bishop Ezekiel Williams, and their team of gospel leaders as they travel to Pharrell's hometown of Hampton Roads, Virginia, in search of talented singers to build a world class gospel choir.

The 6-episode series produced by A. Smith & Co. and I Am Other and was released on Netflix on November 20, 2020.

Episodes

References

External links 
 

2020 American television series debuts
2020s American documentary television series
Netflix original documentary television series
Documentaries about music
English-language Netflix original programming